Benjamin Giezendanner ( born 22 April 1982) is a Swiss businessman and politician. 

He currently serves as a member of the National Council for the Swiss People's Party (SVP) since 2 December 2019. He is the youngest son of former National Councillor Ulrich Giezendanner (b. 1953) and brother of incumbent Grand Councillor Stefan Giezendanner (b. 1978)

Early life and education 
Giezendanner was born the youngest of three children born to businessman and former politician Ulrich Giezendanner and his first wife Helene (d. 1997). He grew-up in Rothrist with his elder brother and sister. His eldest brother, Oliver, died in early childhood. His paternal family originally hailed from Wattwil, St. Gallen, Switzerland. His grandfather Johann Ulrich Giezendanner formed Giezendanner Group in 1934, which specializes in transportation and logistics. A maternal great-grandfather was among the founders of Stahlrohr A.-G. (which would later be integrated into Benteler International). 

He completed a banking apprenticeship at UBS in Aarau. After spending nine months in San Diego, California, he returned to Switzerland, were he studied Economics at the University of St. Gallen (Licentiate I).

Career 
After several years in banking, he took-over management of the family business in 2008 alongside his elder brother Stefan. Since 2017, he became a shareholder of the group, after his father Ulrich Giezendanner retired but remained on the board of directors. In the same year it became public, that the brothers will not continue to work together, and Stefan steps back from management by the end of 2018, due to internal discrepancies.

Politics 
In 2001, Giezendanner was elected to the Grand Council of Aargau. At the age of 18 he was the youngest elected councillor of all time. On October 23, 2016, he achieved the best result with 6049 votes in the elections for the Grand Council in the Zofingen District. In 2017, he was elected Speaker of Parliament with 134 out of 135 votes. In October 2019, Giezendanner ran in the elections to the National Council and was elected, subsequently he resigned from his position in the Grand Council which he held for over 16 years.

Benjamin Giezendanner's political focus is on trade and economic policy, transport and security policy as well as family policy. He has been a board member of the Aargau Trade Association since 2016 and President since 2020. He has been a member of the board of trustees of the Aargau Foundation for Freedom and Responsibility in Politics and Business since 2015.

In 2022, Giezendanner made public, that he intents to campaign for a seat on the Council of States.

Personal life 
He is married to Jasmine (née Litschi) Giezendanner, who also grew-up in Rothrist, and has three daughters. They reside in Rothrist, Switzerland. 

In the Swiss Armed Forces he holds the rank as captain.

External links 

 Giezendanner, Benjamin on The Federal Assembly - The Swiss Parliament 
 Benjamin Giezendanner on Official Website

References 

1982 births
Living people